Harry Potter and the Deathly Hallows – Part 2 is a 2011 fantasy film directed by David Yates from a screenplay by Steve Kloves. The film is the second of two cinematic parts based on the 2007 novel Harry Potter and the Deathly Hallows by J. K. Rowling. It is the sequel to Harry Potter and the Deathly Hallows – Part 1 (2010) and the eighth and final instalment in the Harry Potter film series. The story concludes Harry Potter's quest to find and destroy Lord Voldemort's Horcruxes in order to stop him once and for all.

The film stars an ensemble cast consisting of Daniel Radcliffe as Harry Potter, and Rupert Grint and Emma Watson as Harry's best friends, Ron Weasley and Hermione Granger, alongside Helena Bonham Carter, Robbie Coltrane, Warwick Davis, Ralph Fiennes, Michael Gambon, John Hurt, Jason Isaacs, Gary Oldman, Alan Rickman, Maggie Smith, David Thewlis, and Julie Walters. Principal photography began on 19 February 2009, and was completed on 12 June 2010, with reshoots taking place in December 2010.

Part 2 was released in 2D, 3D and IMAX formats in the United Kingdom and the United States on 15 July 2011, by Warner Bros. Pictures, and is the only Harry Potter film to be released in 3D. The film was a commercial success and one of the best-reviewed films of 2011, earning praise for the acting, Yates's direction, musical score, visual effects, cinematography, action sequences, and satisfying conclusion of the saga. At the box office, Part 2 claimed the worldwide opening weekend record, earning $483.2 million, as well as setting opening day and opening weekend records in various countries. Part 2 grossed over $1.3 billion worldwide and became the third-highest-grossing film, as well as the highest-grossing film of 2011. It is currently the highest-grossing film in the Harry Potter series, as well as in the Wizarding World franchise, and the highest-grossing film released by Warner Bros. The film was nominated for many awards, including the Academy Award for Best Art Direction, Best Makeup and Best Visual Effects.

The DVD and Blu-ray were released on 11 November 2011 in the United States and on 2 December 2011 in the United Kingdom. Part 1 and Part 2 were released as a combo pack on DVD and Blu-ray on 11 November 2011 in Canada. The film was also released in the Harry Potter: Complete 8-Film Collection box set on DVD and Blu-ray, which included all eight films and new special features.

Plot

After burying Dobby, Harry Potter asks the goblin Griphook to help him, along with Ron Weasley and Hermione Granger, break into Bellatrix Lestrange's vault at Gringotts bank, suspecting a Horcrux is there. Griphook agrees, in exchange for the Sword of Gryffindor. Wandmaker Ollivander tells Harry that two wands taken from Malfoy Manor belonged to Bellatrix and Draco Malfoy; he senses Draco's wand has changed its allegiance to Harry, who captured it from Draco. A horcrux, Helga Hufflepuff's cup, is found in Bellatrix's vault, but Griphook snatches the sword and abandons them. Trapped by security, they release the dragon guardian and flee Gringotts on its back. Harry has a vision of Lord Voldemort at Gringotts, furious at the theft. Harry also realises a Horcrux connected to Rowena Ravenclaw is hidden at Hogwarts. The trio apparate into Hogsmeade and are helped by Aberforth Dumbledore, who reveals a secret passageway into Hogwarts, which Neville Longbottom guides them through.

Severus Snape knows Harry has returned and threatens to punish any staff or students who aid Harry. Harry confronts Snape, who flees during a duel with Professor McGonagall. McGonagall rouses the Hogwarts community for battle. Luna Lovegood urges Harry to speak to Helena Ravenclaw's ghost. Helena reveals Voldemort performed "dark magic" on her mother's diadem, and tells Harry that the diadem is somewhere in the Room of Requirement. In the Chamber of Secrets, Ron and Hermione destroy the Horcrux cup with a Basilisk fang. Draco, Blaise Zabini and Gregory Goyle attack Harry in the Room of Requirement, but Ron and Hermione intervene. Goyle casts an uncontrollable Fiendfyre curse that kills him while Harry, Ron, and Hermione save Malfoy and Zabini and escape on brooms. Once outside, Harry stabs the diadem with the Basilisk fang and Ron kicks it to the inferno. As Voldemort's army attacks, Harry, seeing into Voldemort's mind, realises that Voldemort's snake Nagini is the final Horcrux. In the boathouse, the trio overhear Voldemort telling Snape that the Elder Wand cannot serve Voldemort until Snape dies; Nagini then viciously attacks Snape. As Snape dies, he gives Harry one of his memories. Meanwhile, Fred Weasley, Remus Lupin, and Nymphadora Tonks are killed in the chaos at Hogwarts.

Harry views Snape's memory in the Pensieve: Snape despised Harry's late father James, who bullied him, but he loved his mother Lily. Following her death, Snape worked with Albus Dumbledore as a double agent amongst the Death Eaters, to protect Harry from Voldemort. Harry also learns that Dumbledore was dying and planned for Snape to kill him. It was Snape who conjured the Patronus doe that led Harry to Gryffindor's sword. Harry also learns that he became an accidental Horcrux when Voldemort's curse originally failed to kill him; Voldemort must now kill Harry to destroy the soul shard within him. Using the Resurrection Stone that had been stored in the Golden Snitch bequeathed to him, Harry summons the spirits of his parents, Sirius Black, and Remus. They comfort him before he surrenders to Voldemort in the Forbidden Forest. Voldemort casts the Killing Curse upon Harry, who awakens in limbo. Dumbledore's spirit meets him and explains that Harry is now free of Voldemort, and can choose to return to his body or move on. Harry chooses the former.

Voldemort displays Harry's apparent corpse and demands that Hogwarts surrender. As Neville draws the Sword of Gryffindor from the Sorting Hat in defiance, Harry reveals he is alive and the Malfoys and many other Death Eaters abandon Voldemort, demoralised after seeing that Harry still lived. While Harry confronts Voldemort in a duel throughout the castle, Ron's mother, Molly, kills Bellatrix in the Great Hall and Neville decapitates Nagini, destroying the last of the horcruxes. Harry finally defeats Voldemort after the Expelliarmus charm deflects the Killing Curse, rebounding it onto the Dark Lord. After the battle, Harry explains to Ron and Hermione that Voldemort never commanded the Elder Wand. It recognised him as its true master after he had disarmed Draco, who had earlier disarmed its previous owner, Dumbledore, atop the Astronomy Tower. Instead of claiming the Elder Wand, Harry destroys it.

Nineteen years later, Harry and his friends proudly watch their children leave for Hogwarts at King's Cross station.

Cast

 Daniel Radcliffe as Harry Potter: A 17-year-old British wizard. 
 Rupert Grint as Ron Weasley: One of Harry's best friends. 
 Emma Watson as Hermione Granger: Harry's other best friend. 
 Helena Bonham Carter as Bellatrix Lestrange: A Death Eater and Sirius Black's cousin and murderer. 
 Robbie Coltrane as Rubeus Hagrid: Harry's half-giant friend and a former member of staff at Hogwarts. 
 Warwick Davis as Filius Flitwick: The Charms master and Head of the Ravenclaw house at Hogwarts; and also as Griphook, a goblin and former employee at Gringotts Bank. 
 Ralph Fiennes as Lord Voldemort: A twisted, evil, power-hungry, powerful wizard, and the founder and supreme leader of the Death Eaters. 
 Michael Gambon as Professor Albus Dumbledore: The late headmaster of Hogwarts. 
 John Hurt as Garrick Ollivander: A wandmaker abducted by the Death Eaters. 
 Jason Isaacs as Lucius Malfoy: Draco Malfoy's father and a disgraced Death Eater. 
 Helen McCrory as Narcissa Malfoy: Draco's mother and Bellatrix's sister.
 Gary Oldman as Sirius Black: Harry's late godfather. 
 Alan Rickman as Professor Severus Snape: Former Head of the Slytherin House and Potions and Defence Against the Dark Arts teacher and the new headmaster of Hogwarts. 
 Maggie Smith as Professor Minerva McGonagall: The Transfiguration teacher and the Head of the Gryffindor house at Hogwarts. 
 David Thewlis as Remus Lupin: A werewolf member of the Order of the Phoenix and a former Defence Against the Dark Arts teacher at Hogwarts. 
 Julie Walters as Molly Weasley: The Weasley matriarch.
 Tom Felton as Draco Malfoy: A Death Eater and son of Lucius and Narcissa Malfoy.
 Bonnie Wright as Ginny Weasley: Ron's younger sister and Harry's love interest.
 Matthew Lewis as Neville Longbottom: A schoolfriend and strong supporter of Harry Potter. Neville secretly loves Luna Lovegood.
 Evanna Lynch as Luna Lovegood: A seemingly dotty schoolfriend of Harry, who provides wise counsel at key moments.
In the book, a significant number of characters who have not appeared since some of the earlier novels reappear to defend Hogwarts in the large, final battle. Director David Yates stated, "I want to get them all back", referring to his desire to bring back as many actors who have appeared in the franchise as possible for that climactic battle sequence in the film. Resultantly, several actors reprise their roles from previous Harry Potter films including Sean Biggerstaff as Oliver Wood, Jim Broadbent as Horace Slughorn, Gemma Jones as Poppy Pomfrey, Miriam Margolyes as Pomona Sprout, and Emma Thompson as Sybill Trelawney. 

The roles of several minor characters were recast or replaced for this film. For example, Ciarán Hinds assumed the role of Aberforth Dumbledore, Albus Dumbledore's brother and bartender of the Hog's Head inn. For the final scene in the film which is set nineteen years after the film's main story, the actors playing the main characters were made to look older through the use of makeup and special effects. After the initial look of the actors' aged appearances leaked onto the Internet, some fans reacted by opining that Radcliffe and Grint looked too old, while Watson did not appear significantly different at all. After primary filming concluded in June 2010, Yates examined the footage, and concluded that the problem could not be resolved through editing or CGI, and had the sequence re-shot that December, with redesigned makeup.

Production

Filming

Part 2 was filmed back-to-back with Harry Potter and the Deathly Hallows – Part 1 from 19 February 2009 to 12 June 2010, with reshoots for the epilogue scene taking place at Leavesden Film Studios on 21 December 2010. Yates, who shot the film with director of photography Eduardo Serra, described Part 2 as "operatic, colourful and fantasy-oriented", a "big opera with huge battles".

Originally set for a single theatrical release, the idea to split the book into two parts was suggested by executive producer Lionel Wigram due to, what David Heyman called, "creative imperative". Heyman initially responded negatively to the idea, but Wigram asked, "No, David. How are we going to do it?". After rereading the book and discussing it with screenwriter Steve Kloves, he agreed with the division.

Sets
In an interview with Architectural Digest, production designer Stuart Craig remarked on creating sets for Part 2. Of the Gringotts Wizarding Bank, he said, "our banking hall, like any other, is made of marble and big marble columns. And it has great strength. The fact that the goblins are the bankers and tellers at the counter helps that feeling of grandeur and solidity and the big proportions. That was part of the fun of the set: we exaggerated the size of it, we exaggerated the weight of it, and we even exaggerated the shine of the marble." About the multiplication of treasure in one of the bank's vaults, he noted, "We made literally thousands of pieces for it and vacuum metallised them to be shiny gold and silver. John Richardson, the special effects supervisor, made a floor that was capable of rising on different levels, so there was kind of a physical swelling of the treasure on it."

Craig spoke about the Battle of Hogwarts to Art Insights Magazine, saying that "the great challenge is the destruction of Hogwarts. The sun rising behind the smoke ... the massive remains of destroyed walls, the entrance hall, the entrance of the Great Hall, part of the roof of the Great Hall completely gone, so yeah. A big challenge there and an enjoyable one really – maybe it helped me and the guys in the art department sort of prepare for the end ... we demolished it before we had to strike it completely." When asked about the King's Cross scene near the end of the film, Craig said, "We experimented a lot, quite honestly. I mean it was quite a protracted process really but we did experiment the sense of it being very burnt out very very kind of white – so we experimented with underlit floors, we experimented with different kind of white covering everything: white paint, white fabric, and the cameraman was involved in how much to expose it, and a series of camera tests were done, so we got there but with a great deal of preparation and research."

Visual effects
Visual effects supervisor Tim Burke said that "It was such a major job to stage the Battle of Hogwarts, and we had to do it in different stages of production. We had shots with complex linking camera moves from wide overviews, to flying into windows and interior spaces. So, we took the plunge at the end of 2008, and started rebuilding the school digitally with Double Negative." He went on to say: "It's taken two years – getting renders out, texturing every facet of the building, constructing interiors to see through windows, building a destruction version of the school. We can design shots with the knowledge that we have this brilliant digital miniature that we can do anything with. With a practical Hogwarts, we would have shot it last summer and been so tied down. Instead, as David Yates finds the flow and structure, we are able to handle new concepts and ideas."

On the quality of 3D in film, Burke told Los Angeles Times, "I think it's good, actually. I think people are going to be really pleased. I know everyone's a little nervous and sceptical of 3D these days, but the work has been done very, very well. We've done over 200 shots in 3D and in the visual effects as well, because so much of it is CG, so the results are very, very good. I think everyone's going to be really impressed with it, actually." Producer David Heyman spoke to SFX magazine about the 3D conversion, saying that "The way David Yates is approaching 3D is he's trying to approach it from a character and story point of view. Trying to use the sense of isolation, of separation that sometimes 3D gives you, to heighten that at appropriate moments. So we're approaching it in a storytelling way."

In 2012, the visual effects in the film were nominated for an Oscar. The film also won the BAFTA Award for Best Special Visual Effects at the 65th BAFTA Awards in 2012.

Music

It was originally planned that John Williams, who composed the scores for the first three instalments, would return to compose the final film's score, but he was unavailable due to scheduling conflicts. It was confirmed that the composer for Part 1, Alexandre Desplat, was set to return for Part 2. In an interview with Film Music Magazine, Desplat stated that scoring Part 2 is "a great challenge" and that he has "a lot of expectations to fulfill and a great deal of work" ahead of him. In a separate interview, Desplat also made note that Williams's themes will be present in the film "much more than in Part 1". The soundtrack for the film was nominated for Best Score Soundtrack for Visual Media at the 54th Annual Grammy Awards.

Marketing

In March 2011, the first preview for Deathly Hallows – Part 2 was released revealing new footage and new interviews from the starring cast. The first United States poster was released on 28 March 2011, with the caption "It All Ends 7.15" (referring to its international release date). On 27 April 2011 the first theatrical trailer for Part 2 was released. The trailer revealed a range of new and old footage. The IMAX trailer for the film was released with IMAX screenings of Pirates of the Caribbean: On Stranger Tides on 20 May 2011. During the MTV Movie Awards on 5 June 2011, Emma Watson presented a sneak peek of the film.

Release

Theatrical

On 2 April 2011, a test screening of the film was held in Chicago, with Yates, Heyman, Barron and editor Mark Day in attendance. Although filmed in 2D, the film was converted into 3D in post-production and was released in both RealD 3D and IMAX 3-D.

The film was originally scheduled to open in Indonesia on 13 July 2011. The Indonesian government levied a new value added tax on royalties from foreign films in February 2011, causing three film studios, including Warner Brothers, to halt the importation of their films, including Harry Potter and the Deathly Hallows – Part 2 into the country. The film was not released to cinemas in the Kingdom of Jordan due to recently enforced taxes on films.

On 10 June, one month before release, tickets went on sale. On 16 June 2011, Part 2 received a 12A certificate from the British Board of Film Classification, who note that the film "contains moderate threat, injury detail and language", becoming the only Harry Potter film to receive a warning for "injury detail". At midnight 15 July, Part 2 screened in 3,800 cinemas. In the United States, it played in 4,375 cinemas, 3,100 3D cinemas and 274 IMAX cinemas, the widest release for an IMAX, 3D and Harry Potter film.

Home media
Harry Potter and the Deathly Hallows – Part 2 was released on 11 November 2011 in the United States in four formats: a one-disc standard DVD, a two-disc standard DVD special edition, a one-disc standard Blu-ray, and three-Disc Blu-ray 2D Combo Pack (Blu-ray + DVD + Digital Copy). In the United Kingdom and Ireland, the film was released on 2 December 2011 in three formats: a two-disc standard DVD, a three-disc Blu-ray 2D Combo Pack (Blu-ray + DVD + Digital Copy), and a four-disc Blu-ray 3D Combo Pack (Blu-ray 3D + Blu-ray 2D + DVD + Digital Copy). The film set the record for fastest-selling pre-order DVD and Blu-ray on Amazon.com, just two days into the pre-order period.

Deathly Hallows – Part 2 sold 2.71 million Blu-ray units ($60.75 million) in three days (Friday to Sunday). It also sold 2.83 million DVD units ($42.22 million) during its debut. By 18 July 2012 it had sold 4.71 million Blu-ray units ($99.33 million) and 6.47 million DVD units ($88.96 million).

On 28 March 2017, Deathly Hallows – Part 2 made its Ultra HD Blu-ray debut, along with Deathly Hallows - Part 1, The Half-Blood Prince, and Order of the Phoenix.

Reception

Box office

Prior to its release, the film was predicted by box office analysts to break records, citing the anticipation built up over the course of 10 years. Harry Potter and the Deathly Hallows – Part 2 grossed $381.4 million in the United States and Canada, along with $960.8 million in other markets, for a worldwide total of $1.342 billion. In worldwide earnings, it was the third-highest-grossing film, the highest-grossing film of 2011, the highest-grossing film in the Harry Potter franchise, and the highest-grossing book adaptation. It also became the highest-grossing film for Warner Bros. as well as the highest-grossing release from parent company WarnerMedia, surpassing The Lord of the Rings: The Return of the King. Part 2 set a worldwide opening-weekend record with $483.2 million. This record would be held for four years before Jurassic World took it in 2015. The film set a worldwide IMAX opening-weekend record with $23.2 million. It set the worldwide record as the fastest film to gross $500 million (6 days), $600 million (8 days), $700 million (10 days), $800 million (12 days), and $900 million (15 days). On 30 July 2011, the film crossed the $1 billion mark, tying the 19-day record that had been set by Avatar.

United States and Canada
In the US and Canada, it is the 27th-highest-grossing film, the highest-grossing film of 2011, the highest-grossing Harry Potter film, the highest-grossing children's book adaptation, the highest-grossing fantasy/live action film and the 13th-highest-grossing 3-D film. Box Office Mojo estimates that the film sold more than 40 million tickets. It set new records in advance ticket sales with $32 million, in its midnight opening with $43.5 million and in its IMAX midnight opening with $2 million. It grossed $91.1 million on its opening Friday, setting a Friday-gross record as well as single- and opening-day records. It also set an opening-weekend record with $169.2 million, an IMAX opening-weekend record of $15.2 million and opening-weekend record for a 3-D film. Although 3-D enhanced the film's earning potential, only 43% of the opening gross came from 3-D venues. This means only $72.8 million of the opening-weekend grosses originated from 3-D showings, the second-largest number at the time.

It also scored the largest three-day and four-day gross, the sixth-highest-grossing opening week (Friday to Thursday) with $226.2 million, and even the seventh-largest seven-day gross. It fell precipitously by 84% on its second Friday and by 72% during its second weekend overall, grossing $47.4 million, which is the largest second-weekend drop for any film that opened to more than $90 million. Still, it managed to become the fastest-grossing film in the franchise and also achieved the second-largest ten-day gross ever at the time (now eighth). In its third weekend, the movie surpassed Harry Potter and the Philosopher's Stone to become the highest-grossing film of the franchise in the US & Canada.

Other territories
Harry Potter and the Deathly Hallows – Part 2 became the third-highest-grossing film, the highest-grossing 2011 film, the highest-grossing Warner Bros. film and the highest-grossing Harry Potter film. On its opening day, Deathly Hallows – Part 2 grossed $43.6 million from 26 countries, placing it 86% ahead of Deathly Hallows – Part 1 and 49% higher than Half-Blood Prince. From Wednesday until Sunday, on its 5-day opening weekend, it set an opening-weekend record outside the US and Canada by earning $314 million. The average 3D share of Deathly Hallows – Part 2 was 60%, which was lower than the 3D share for Transformers: Dark of the Moon (70%) and On Stranger Tides (66%). On its second weekend, it held to the top spot, but fell precipitously by 62% to $120.2 million despite minor competition. This amount is about the same as what On Stranger Tides made from its second weekend ($124.3 million). Deathly Hallows – Part 2 was in first place at the box office outside North America for four consecutive weekends.

In the United Kingdom, Ireland and Malta it brought in a record $14.8 million on its first day. On its opening weekend it earned £23,753,171 in the United Kingdom, marking the second largest opening weekend in 2011. Its performance did not surpass that of Harry Potter and the Prisoner of Azkaban in 2004, which earned £23,882,688 on its opening weekend. In United States dollars, its opening weekend was an all-time record $38.3 million, ahead of Harry Potter and the Order of the Phoenix ($33.5 million). The film also achieved the largest single-day gross on its first Saturday and the largest opening week with $57.6 million. The film made a total of £73.1 million ($117.2 million) at the United Kingdom box office, making it the tenth-highest-grossing film. It also is the highest-grossing film of 2011 and the highest-grossing Wizarding World film.

Deathly Hallows – Part 2 also set opening-day records in Mexico ($6.1 million), Australia ($7.5 million), France and the Maghreb region ($7.1 million), Italy ($4.6 million), Sweden ($2.1 million), Norway ($1.8 million), Denmark ($1.6 million), the Netherlands ($1.7 million), Belgium ($1.4 million), the Czech Republic ($2.0 million), Argentina ($961,000), Finland ($749,000) and Hong Kong ($808,000). It also established new Harry Potter opening-day records in Japan ($5.7 million), Brazil ($4.4 million), Russia and the CIS ($4.2 million), Spain ($3.3 million) and Poland ($1.25 million).

Deathly Hallows – Part 2 set opening weekend records in India with 15 crores ($3.41 million), Australia with $19.6 million, New Zealand with $2.46 million, Brazil with $11. million, Scandinavia with $18.5 million, Mexico with $15.9 million and many other Latin American and European countries.

Critical response
The site's critical consensus reads, "Thrilling, powerfully acted, and visually dazzling, Deathly Hallows Part II brings the Harry Potter franchise to a satisfying – and suitably magical – conclusion." On Metacritic, which assigns a normalised rating to reviews, the film has a score of 85 out of 100 based on 41 reviews, indicating "universal acclaim". The film received a score of 93 from professional critics at the Broadcast Film Critics Association; it is the organisation's highest-rated Harry Potter film. Audiences surveyed by CinemaScore gave the film an average grade of "A" on an A+ to F scale.

Philip Womack in The Daily Telegraph commented, "This is monumental cinema, awash with gorgeous tones, and carrying an ultimate message that will resonate with every viewer, young or old: there is darkness in all of us, but we can overcome it." He further expressed that David Yates "transmutes [the book] into a genuinely terrifying spectacle." Another review was released on the same day from Evening Standard, who rated the film four out of five and stated "Millions of children, parents, and those who should know better won't need reminding what a Horcrux is – and director David Yates does not let them down. In fact, in some ways, he helps make up for the shortcomings of the final book." The Daily Express remarked that the film showcases "a terrifying showdown that easily equals Lord of the Rings or Star Wars in terms of a dramatic and memorable battle between good and evil".

Roger Ebert of the Chicago Sun-Times gave the film three and a half stars out of four and said, "The finale conjures up enough awe and solemnity to serve as an appropriate finale and a dramatic contrast to the lighthearted (relative) innocence of Harry Potter and the Sorcerer's Stone all those magical years ago." Mark Kermode from the BBC said that the film is a "pretty solid and ambitious adaptation of a very complex book", but he criticised the post-converted 3D. Christy Lemire of the Associated Press gave the film three and a half out of four and said "While Deathly Hallows: Part 2 offers long-promised answers, it also dares to pose some eternal questions, and it'll stay with you after the final chapter has closed." Richard Roeper, also from the Chicago Sun-Times, gave the film an A+ rating and said: "This is a masterful and worthy final chapter in one of the best franchises ever put to film."

In one of the few negative reviews, Brian Gibson of Vue Weekly described the film as "deadly dull" and a "visual overstatement". Other reviews criticised the decision to split the novel into two cinematic parts, with Ben Mortimer of The Daily Telegraph writing "Deathly Hallows – Part 2 isn't a film. It's HALF a film ... it's going to feel somewhat emotionless." Other critics wrote of the film's runtime; Alonso Duralde from The Wrap said, "If there's one substantial flaw to the film, it's that this cavalcade of people and places and objects can barely fit in the 130-minute running time." Rebecca Gillie from The Oxford Student gave the film two out of five and wrote: "At the end of [the film] there is nothing that stays with you once you've left the cinema."

Accolades
The film won a number of accolades and nominations. Harry Potter and the Deathly Hallows – Part 2 was nominated for Best Art Direction, Best Makeup, and Best Visual Effects at the 84th Academy Awards. At the 65th BAFTA awards, the film won the Best Visual Effects award, and was nominated in the Best Sound, Best Production Design and Best Make-up and Hair categories.

The film was nominated for Best Score Soundtrack for Visual Media at the 54th Annual Grammy Awards in 2012. It won a Screen Actors Guild Award for Outstanding Performance by a Stunt Ensemble in a Motion Picture. The film scored 10 nominations at the annual Saturn Awards, Winning for Best Fantasy Film. In the 2011 Scream Awards, the film received a total of 14 nominations, and won in The Ultimate Scream, Best Scream-Play, Best Fantasy Actor (Daniel Radcliffe), Best Villain (Ralph Fiennes), Best F/X, and Holy Sh*t scene of the Year categories.

Future

In July 2016, Warner Bros. Entertainment, Inc. applied to purchase the rights to the stage play Harry Potter and the Cursed Child, a sequel to Harry Potter and the Deathly Hallows, leading to speculation that the stage play was going to be made into a film.

In November 2021, Chris Columbus, who directed the first two instalments of the film series, expressed interest in directing an adaptation of Harry Potter and the Cursed Child, with the intent of having the main cast members reprise their roles. When The New York Times asked Daniel Radcliffe whether he would return to his role as Harry Potter, he replied that he is not interested at the moment, but would not deny the possibility of returning to it in the future.

References

External links

 
 
 
 
 Harry Potter and the Deathly Hallows – Part 2 at The Numbers

2011 3D films
2011 fantasy films
American 3D films
American high fantasy films
American sequel films
BAFTA winners (films)
British 3D films
British fantasy films
British sequel films
Films about the afterlife
Films about rebellions
Films directed by David Yates
Films produced by David Barron
Films produced by David Heyman
Films produced by J. K. Rowling
Films scored by Alexandre Desplat
Films set in 1998
Films set in 2017
Films set in England
Films set in Scotland
Films set in London
Films shot at Warner Bros. Studios, Leavesden
Films shot in England
Films shot in London
Films shot in Scotland
Films shot in Wales
Films with screenplays by Steve Kloves
07
Heyday Films films
IMAX films
Warner Bros. films
Children's fantasy films
Limbo
2010s English-language films
2010s American films
2010s British films